Virtus was a specific virtue in Ancient Rome.  It carries connotations of valor, manliness, excellence, courage, character, and worth, perceived as masculine strengths (from Latin vir, "man"). It was thus a frequently stated virtue of Roman emperors, and was personified as a deity—Virtus.

Origins 

The origins of the word virtus can be traced back to the Latin word vir, "man".  The common list of attributes associated with virtus are typically perceived masculine strengths, which may indicate its derivation from vir. From the early to the later days of the Roman Empire, there appears to have been a development in how the concept was understood.

Originally virtus was used to describe specifically martial courage, but it eventually grew to be used to describe a range of Roman virtues. It was often divided into different qualities including prudentia (prudence), iustitia (justice), temperantia (temperance, self-control), and fortitudo (courage). This division of virtue as a whole into cardinal virtues is today classified as virtue ethics, as described by Plato's Republic and Aristotle's Nicomachean Ethics. It implies a link between virtus and the Greek concept of arete.

This inclusion leads to the belief that at one time virtus extended to cover a wide range of meanings that covered one general ethical ideal. The use of the word began to grow and shift to fit the new idea of what manliness meant.
No longer did virtus mean that a person was a brave warrior but it could also mean that he was a good man, someone who did the right thing.  During the time of the decline of the Roman elite virtus the Roman upper class no longer thought of themselves as unmanly if they did not serve in the military.

In Roman political philosophy 

Virtus comes from the aristocratic tradition in which it is a specific type of public conduct. It is really only applicable in the cursus honorum, certainly by the late republic at least. It is not a "private" virtue in the way that modern people might consider it. Valor, courage, and manliness are not things that can be pursued in the private sphere of the individual or the individual's private concerns. There could be no virtue in exploiting one's manliness in the pursuit of personal wealth, for example. Virtus is exercised in the pursuit of gloria for the benefit of the res publica resulting in the winning of eternal "memoria". According to D.C. Earl "Outside the service of the res publica there can be no magistratus and therefore, strictly speaking, no gloria, no nobilitas, no virtus".

For the nobility virtus lies not only in one's personal "acta" but also that of one's ancestors. However Cicero, a novus homo, asserted that virtus was a virtue particularly suited to the new man just as nobilitas was suited to the noble.  Cicero argued that just as young men from noble families won the favor of the people so too should the novus homo earn the favor of the people with his virtus. He even extended the argument that virtus and not one's family history should decide a man's worthiness. Virtus is something that a man earns himself, not something that is given to him by his family, thus it is a better measure of a man's ability.  Cicero's goal was not to impugn the noble class but widen it to include men who had earned their positions by merit.

The term was used quite significantly by the historian Sallust, a contemporary of Cicero. Sallust asserted that it did not rightfully belong to the nobilitas as a result of their family background but specifically to the novus homo through the exercise of ingenium (talent, also means sharpness of mind, sagacity, foresight and character). For Sallust and Cicero alike, virtus is situated in the winning of glory by the execution of illustrious deeds (egregia facinora) and the observance of right conduct through bonae artes.

Applicability 

Virtus was not universally applicable to just anyone – generally (although not always exclusively) only adult male Roman citizens would be thought of as possessing virtus.

Women 
Virtus  was rarely attributed to women, likely because of its association with vir.  The highest regarded female virtue was pudicitia: "modesty" or "chastity".  Cicero, however, attributes this characteristic to females several times. He uses it once to describe Caecilia Metella when she helps a man who is being chased by assassins. Twice more he uses it when describing his daughter, Tullia, portraying her in his letters as brave in his absence.  He uses it again to describe his first wife Terentia during his exile.
Livy in Book 2 attributes it to Cloelia.

Children 
Virtus was not a term commonly used to describe children.  Since virtus was primarily attributed to a full grown man who had served in the military, children were not particularly suited to obtain this particular virtue.

Slaves 
While a slave was able to be homo ("man") he was not considered a vir. Slaves were often referred to as puer (Latin for boy) to denote that they were not citizens. Since a slave could not be a vir it follows that they would not be allowed to have the quality of virtus. Once a slave was manumitted he was able to become a vir and he was also classified as a freedman but this did not allow him to have virtus.  A good slave or freedman was said to have fides, but no virtus.

Foreigners 
Foreigners in the Roman world could be attributed with virtus:  If they fought bravely they could be said to have virtus.  Virtus could also be lost in battle.  Virtus could even be a cause to gain citizenship as in the case of Spanish cavalry men granted citizenship by Cn. Pompeius Strabo in 89 BC for their virtus in battle.

How was it used 
Virtus applies exclusively to a man's behaviour in the public sphere, i.e. to the application of duty to the res publica in the cursus honorum. His private business was no place to earn virtus, even when it involved courage or feats of arms or other qualities associated to it if performed for the public good.

In private 
While in many cultures around the world it is considered "manly" to father and provide for a family, family life was considered in the Roman world to be part of the private sphere.  During this time there was no place for virtus in the private sphere.  Most uses of virtus to describe any part of private life are ambiguous and often refer to another similar quality. In the Roman world the oldest living patriarch of the family was called the pater familias and this title implied that he was able to make all legal and binding decisions for the family; he also owned all the money, land, and other property.  His wife, daughters, sons, and his sons' families were all under his potestas.  The only time a son was seen as separate from his father's control in the eyes of other Romans was when he assumed his public identity as a citizen. He could earn his virtus by serving in the military, and thus could only demonstrate manliness outside of the family setting. This is another reason that virtus is not often used to describe the Roman private life.

In public 
Virtus was a crucial component for a political career. Its broad definition led to it being used to describe a number of qualities that the Roman people idealized in their leaders.

In everyday life a typical Roman, especially a young boy, would have been inculcated with the idea of virtus.  Since military service was a part of most Roman men's life, military training would have started fairly early. Young boys would have learned how to wield weapons and military tactics starting at home with their fathers and older male relatives and later in school.  Also as a young boy one would have heard numerous stories about past heroes, battles, and wars.  Some of these stories would have surely told of the virtus of past heroes, and even family members.  Publicly it was easy to see the rewards of virtus.  Public triumphs were held for victorious generals and rewards were given to brave fighters.  All of this propaganda would have encouraged young boys coming into their manhood to be brave fighters and earn the attribute of virtus.  It was the duty of every generation of men to maintain the dignitas which his family had already earned and enlarge it.  This pressure to live up to the standards of one's ancestors was great.  In achieving virtus one could achieve gloria.  By gaining virtus and gloria one could hope to aspire to high political office and great renown.

Cicero suggested strongly that Virtus was real manhood and its boiled down to "Ever to excel," declared that "The whole glory of virtue [virtus] resides in activity.". A Roman political man would only need to show scars in defense of Republic to prove he has worth.

Romans established their our own status through activity, creating a pecking order of honour. This involved  agon - a test, trial, or ordeal, requiring active effort to overcome. In that active form, the  characteristics of Roman thought believed to be negative; the "stone and ice" tendencies antithetical to virtue were banished. Such negative characteristics included being unashamed, inactive, isolated, leisurely and we’re the absence of virtus; placing dignitas into a static, frozen state. The contest established your being and constructed the reality of one’s virtus. Romans were willing to suffer shame, humiliation, victory, defeat, glory, destruction, success and failure in pursuit of this.

While young boys were encouraged to earn virtus there were also limits put on showing virtus in public. Virtus was often associated with being aggressive and this could be very dangerous in the public sphere and the political world.  Displays of violent virtus were controlled through several methods.  Men seeking to hold political office typically had to follow the cursus honorum.  Many political offices had an age minimum which ensured that the men filling the positions had the proper amount of experience in the military and in government.  This meant that even if a man proved himself capable of filling a position or was able to persuade people that he was capable, he would not necessarily be able to hold the position until he had reached a certain age. This also served to ensure that in elections of public offices no one had a certain advantage over another person because by the time most men went into public office they would have retired from military service. Furthermore, before any Roman soldier could partake in single combat he had to gain permission from his general. This procedure was meant to keep soldiers from putting themselves in extremely dangerous situations that they may or may not have been able to handle in order gain virtus.

The concept of virtus also tended to be a concept of morality as far as politics were concerned.  This could range from the very literal definition of manliness seen in aggression and the ruthless acquisition of money, land, and power, or the lighter, more idealistic political meaning which almost took on the extended meaning of "pietas", a man who was morally upright and concerned with the matters of the state.  Plautus in Amphitruo contrasted virtus and ambitio.  Virtus is seen as a positive attribute, though ambitio itself is not necessarily a negative attribute but is often associated with negative methods such as bribery.  Plautus said that just as great generals and armies win victory by virtus, so should political candidates.  Ambitio "is the wrong method of reaching a good end."  Part of virtus, in the political sphere was to deal justly in every aspect of one's life, especially in political and state matters.

According to Brett and Kate McKay the Roman identity exists in a paradigm, it was a contest culture and honor culture, Roman's believed "your identity was neither fixed nor permanent, your worth was a moving target, and you had to always be actively engaged in proving yourself.".

Military 

Although the two concepts are related, virtus, for the Roman, did not necessarily emphasize the behavior that the associations of the present-day English term 'virtue' suggest. Virtus was to be found in the context of 'outstanding deeds' (egregia facinora), and brave deeds were the accomplishments which brought gloria ('a reputation'). This gloria was attached to two ideas: fama ('what people think of you') and dignitas ('one's standing in the community'). The struggle for virtus in Rome was above all a struggle for public office (honos), since it was through aspiring to high office, to which one was elected by the People, that a man could best show his manliness by means of military achievement which would in turn cultivate a reputation and votes. It was the duty of every aristocrat and would-be aristocrat to maintain the dignitas which his family had already achieved and to extend it to the greatest possible degree, through higher political office and military victories. This system resulted in a strong built-in impetus in Roman society to engage in military expansion and conquest at all times.

Sexuality 
While in many cultures the virtue of manliness is seen as being partly sexual, in the Roman world the word virtus did not necessitate sexuality. Similar words deriving from the same stem often have sexual connotations, such as the word for man itself (vir) and the concept of "virility" (virilitas), though virtus most commonly was employed in the contexts of martial courage, honour, and ethical correctness. Nonetheless, poems such as Catullus 16 and the Carmina Priapea, as well as speeches such as Cicero's In Verrem, demonstrate that manliness and pudicitia, or sexual propriety, are inextricably linked.

Marcellus and the Temple
M. Claudius Marcellus, during the battle of Clastidium in 222 BC, dedicated a temple to Honos and Virtus.  This was one of the first times that Virtus had been recognized as divine. The connection with Honos would have been obvious to most Romans as demonstrations of virtus led to election to public office and both were considered honos.  The cult of Honos was already a long-standing tradition in Rome. The marriage of the two deities ensured that Virtus would also get proper respect from the Romans. But an objection by the pontiffs was that one temple could not properly house two gods because there would be no way of knowing which god to sacrifice to should a miracle happen in the temple.

Augustus

During the reign of Augustus, the Senate voted that a golden shield be inscribed with Augustus' attributes and displayed in the Curia Iulia, including virtus, clementia, iustitia, and pietas. These political catchwords continued to be used as propaganda by later emperors.

In literature 

The comic poet Plautus made use of the concept of virtus in his play Trinummus which concerned family virtus, honor and public office, and obligations to the state. He also offered commentary on the concept of virtus in Amphitruo (see above "Virtus and the Public").

Cicero said, "[only] virtus usually wards off a cruel and dishonorable death, and virtus is the badge of the Roman race and breed [sic]. Cling fast to [virtus], I beg you men of Rome, as a heritage that your ancestors bequeathed to you. All else is false and doubtful, ephemeral and changeful: only virtus stands firmly fixed, its roots run deep, it can never be shaken by any violence, never moved from its place."

See also
 Virtue § Roman virtues – contains a list of Roman virtues
 Arete (moral virtue)
 Justice
 Prudence
 Courage
 Clementia
 Pietas
 Gravitas

Notes

References

Citations

Bibliography 

Latin political words and phrases
Ancient Roman virtues